Hawk Hill may refer to:
 Hawk Hill, California, a bird-watching site in the Marin Headlands
 Hawk Hill, the campus of Saint Joseph's University
 Hawk Hill (New York), an elevation in Otsego County, New York